Jānis Jaks (born 22 August 1995) is a Latvian professional ice hockey defenceman currently an unrestricted free agent. He most recently played for HC Sochi of the Kontinental Hockey League (KHL).

Playing career

Collegiate
Jaks joined the Yellow Jackets for the 2016–17 campaign and quickly became a mainstay of their blue line, scoring five goals and six assists for 11 points as a freshman, including two game-winning goals.

Professional
On 30 March 2020, Jaks was signed to a one-year contract with the Bakersfield Condors of the AHL for the 2020–21 season. With the commencement of the 2020–21 North American season delayed due to the COVID-19 pandemic, Jaks was signed to a try-out contract with Latvian-based KHL club, Dinamo Riga, on 23 August 2020. Jaks appeared in 17 contests with Dinamo, collecting 1 goal and 4 points before returning to the AHL and the Condors. In completing his first professional season, Jaks contributed with two goals and 6 points from the blueline with the Condors.

Jaks left North America as a free agent and signed a one-year contract to return to the KHL with Russian-based club HC Sochi on 19 July 2021.

International play
Jaks played for Latvia's junior team at the 2013 and 2014 World Junior Championships. He played his first game at the senior international level in the 2014 World Championships for Latvia's national team against Russia's national team.

Career statistics

Regular season and playoffs

International

Awards and honors

References

External links

1995 births
Living people
American International Yellow Jackets men's ice hockey players
Bakersfield Condors players
Dinamo Riga players
HK Riga players
HK Zemgale players
Latvian ice hockey defencemen
Ice hockey players at the 2022 Winter Olympics
Olympic ice hockey players of Latvia
HC Sochi players
Ice hockey people from Riga